Thangmeiband is a region in Imphal city, Manipur, India, which has a population of about 50,000. Thangmeiband is one of the 60 constituencies which elect the Manipur Legislative Assembly.

References

Imphal